Potli Baba Ki (Baba's Tales) (1991) is  an Indian children's puppet television series aired in India in 1991 on Doordarshan. It featured various fairy tales in simple language and used to give good moral messages to children. The title song "Aaya Re Baba" sang by Vinod Sehgal and  composed by Hindustani poet and lyricist Gulzar, who was also the co-producer, director and writer of the show.

The series has two parts: "Ali Baba and the Forty Thieves" (ten episodes) and "Aladdin and the Magic Lamp" (ten episodes).

Synopsis 
The series has a story-teller in the form of an old man called as 'Baba' — who in his 'Potli' has various stories. The old story-teller, Chhenu ki Jhunnu ka Baba, living in Ghungar village, collects stories and fables which his mother has left hidden under rocks. Baba's peculiarity is that is growing younger day-by-day and once he will find all the stories he will be a child.

References

External links 
Children's Film Society, India

1990s stop-motion animated films
1991 Indian television series debuts
Indian children's television series
Gulzar
DD National original programming
Puppetry in India
Works based on Aladdin
Works based on Ali Baba
1990s children's animated films
1991 animated films
1991 films
Works based on One Thousand and One Nights